Lonnie G. Bunch III (born November 18, 1952) is an American educator and historian.  Bunch is the 14th Secretary of the Smithsonian Institution, the first African American and first historian to serve as head of the Smithsonian. He has spent most of his career as a history museum curator and administrator.

Bunch served as the founding director of the Smithsonian's National Museum of African American History and Culture (NMAAHC) from 2005 to 2019. He previously served as president and director of the Chicago History Museum (Chicago Historical Society) from 2000 to 2005. In the 1980s, he was the first curator at the California African American Museum, and then a curator at the Smithsonian's National Museum of American History, wherein the 1990s, he rose to head curatorial affairs. In 2020 he was elected to the American Philosophical Society.

Early life
Bunch was born in Newark, New Jersey, in 1952 to Lonnie Bunch II (a science and chemistry public school teacher) and Montrose Bunch (a third-grade public school teacher), both graduates of Shaw University, one of the oldest HBCUs in the South. He grew up in Belleville, New Jersey, where his family were the only African Americans in their neighborhood. His grandfather, a former sharecropper, moved into the area as one of the first black dentists in the region. As a child, he experienced racism from white teenagers in his neighborhood. Bunch credits his childhood experiences with local Italian immigrants and his reading of biographies as a youth with inspiring him to study history. He wanted to give a voice to those who were "anonymous" or not written about. Reflecting in 2011 on the early exposures, Bunch said: "I was in junior high, and we were reading biographies of historic figures. I remember one on Gen. ‘Mad Anthony’ Wayne, and one on Clara Barton, and Dorothea Dix. I thought, ‘Were there no histories of black people?’ One day, I was going through my grandfather's trunk and I found a book about black soldiers in the First World War. I devoured it."

Education
He graduated from Belleville High School in 1970. Bunch attended Howard University but transferred to American University, Washington, DC, where he earned his B.A. and M.A. in American history and African history.

Professional career

Bunch started working at the Smithsonian Institution while he was working on his master's degree. After graduating, he was hired as a history professor at the University of Maryland. In 1983, he became the first curator at the California African American Museum. He worked at the National Museum of American History from 1989 until 1994 as a curator. He was promoted to Associate Director for Curatorial Affairs at the museum before leaving in 2000 to become the president of one of the nation's oldest museums in history, the Chicago Historical Society (Chicago History Museum), from 2001 to 2005. In Chicago he led a successful capital campaign, and promoted outreach to diverse communities. One noted exhibit, Teen Chicago, focused on teenager life.

In 2005, Bunch was named the director of the Smithsonian Institution's National Museum of African American History and Culture. As founding director he designed a program of traveling exhibitions and public events prior to the opening of the museum.

He also served on the Commission for the Preservation of the White House during the George W. Bush administration and was reappointed to the Commission by President Barack Obama in 2010.

On May 28, 2019, Bunch was elected Secretary of the Smithsonian Institution. He became the first historian and first African American to lead the Smithsonian in its 173-year history, taking on his new role in mid-June 2019 On February 12, 2021, Bunch was appointed to the Congressionally-mandated Commission on the Naming of Items of the Department of Defense that Commemorate the Confederate States of America or Any Person Who Served Voluntarily with the Confederate States of America.

Exhibits and research
He curated the National Museum of American History exhibition The American Presidency: A Glorious Burden. The exhibition was curated, built, and opened within eight months.

Personal life 
Bunch met Maria Marable in graduate school; they would eventually marry and she became Maria Marable-Bunch. The couple has two daughters.

Notable awards 

 2011: Jackie Robinson Society Community Recognition Award 
 2017: American Academy of Arts and Sciences
 2017:  the NAACP's President's Award
 2018: Phi Beta Kappa Award for Distinguished Service to Humanity 
 2019: Honorary degree of Brown University (LHD)
 2020: Dan David Prize
 2022: Golden Plate Award of the American Academy of Achievement

Bibliography
 with Laurence P. and Martha Kendall Crouchette Winnaker, Visions Toward Tomorrow, the History of the East Bay Afro-American Community 1852–1977. Oakland: Northern California Center for Afro-American History and Life. 1989. 
 with Spencer R. Crew, Mark G. Hirsch and Harry R. Rubenstein, 2000. The American Presidency, A Glorious Burden. Washington: Smithsonian Institution. 
 with Donna M. Wells, David E. Haberstitch and Deborah Willis, 2009. The Scurlock Studio and Black Washington: Picturing the Promise. Washington: National Museum of African American History and Culture. 
 Call the Lost Dream Back: Essays on History, Race & Museums. Georgia: Big River Books. 2010. 
 with Spencer R. Crew and Clement A. Price, 2014. Slave Culture: A Documentary Collection of the Slave Narratives from the Federal Writers Project. Connecticut: Greenwood.

Footnotes

References

External links

 
 
 

1952 births
Living people
21st-century American historians
21st-century American male writers
American University alumni
Belleville High School (New Jersey) alumni
People from Belleville, New Jersey
Writers from Newark, New Jersey
Secretaries of the Smithsonian Institution
African-American museum directors
Directors of museums in the United States
Members of the American Philosophical Society
African-American curators
American curators
Historians from New Jersey
American male non-fiction writers
21st-century African-American writers
20th-century African-American people
African-American male writers